'Victor Sunico Diaz, popularly known as Vic Diaz, (July 29, 1932 – September 15, 2006) was a Filipino character actor who mostly portrayed villains. He was also the father of Teddy Diaz, the founding guitarist of the Filipino Rock band The Dawn.

Career
Diaz first part in front of the camera was an uncredited role as a Japanese General in American Guerrilla in the Philippines (1950) directed by Fritz Lang.

He appeared in The Big Bird Cage, Black Mama White Mama and played Satan in Eddie Romero's Beast of the Yellow Night. He appeared in a number of other Filipino horror films in the 70s such as Blood Thirst, Beyond Atlantis, Daughters of Satan and Night of the Cobra Woman.

Personal life
Diaz was married to Kit Diaz who have 3 children: Teddy (1963-1988), Loren and Carl Diaz. He is not related to Paquito Diaz and Romy Diaz.

Death
Diaz died on September 15, 2006 at the age of 74. His remains were shared with his son at Santuario de San Antonio Parish in Makati City.

Filmography

 1957 Bicol Express (Premiere)
 1958 Malvarosa (LVN)
 1958 Eddie Junior Detective (LVN)
 1958 Obra-Maestra (People's)
 1958 Ana María (LVN)
 1958 Casa grande (LVN)
 1958 Sisang Tabak (Cinematic Phil Inc.)
 1959 The Scavengers (Lynn-Romero Productions)
 1961 Asiong Salonga (Larry Santiago Productions)
 1963 Cavalry Command (Premiere)
 1964 Kulay Dugo Ang Gabi...aka The Blood Drinkers (USA) (People's Pictures)
 1964 Flight to Fury
 1964 From Hell to Borneo
 1964 Moro Witch Doctor (Associated Producers Inc.)
 1965 Operation C.I.A. (Allied Artists Pictures Corporation)
 1965 The Ravagers (Hemisphere Pictures Inc.)
 1966 The Passionate Strangers (MJP)
 1968 Mission Batangas (Diba Productions)
 1968 Escape to Mindanao (Universal TV)
 1969 Surabaya Conspiracy
 1969 Impasse (Aubrey Schenck Productions)
 1970 Nam's Angels aka The Losers (Fanfare Films Inc.)
 1971 Blood Thirst (Shot 1965, not released in U.S. until 1971)
 1971 Beast of the Yellow Night (Cinema Projects International)
 1972 Night of the Cobra Woman (New World Pictures)
 1972 Black Mama, White Mama (American International Pictures)
 1972 The Big Bird Cage (New World Pictures)
 1972 Superbeast (A&S Productions)
 1972 Daughters of Satan (A&S Productions)
 1973 Fly Me
 1973 Wonder Women (American National Enterprises)
 1973 Savage! (New World Pictures)
 1973 Beyond Atlantis (Dimension Pictures Inc)
 1973 A Taste of Hell
 1974 The Deathhead Virgin
 1974 The Dragon Force Connection
 1974 Savage Sisters
 1974 Bamboo Gods and Iron Men
 1974 The Thirsty Dead
 1975 The Pacific Connection
 1975 Cover Girl Models
 1976 Hustler Squad
 1976 Project: Kill
 1976 The Interceptors
 1977 Totoy Bato (FPJ Productions)
 1977 Bawa't Himaymay ng Aking Laman
 1977 Too Hot to Handle
 1978 The Boys in Company C 
 1978 Vampire Hookers
 1978 Patayin si... Mediavillo (FPJ Productions)
 1979 ...At Muling Nagbaga ang Lupa (FPJ Productions)
 1979 Durugin si Totoy Bato (FPJ Productions)
 1979 Ang Lihim ng Guadalupe (FPJ Productions)
 1982 Raw Force
 1986 Muslim .357 (EDL Productions)
 1986 Iyo ang Tondo, Kanya ang Cavite (BSH Films)
 1987 Maharlika
 1987 Target: Sparrow Unit
 1987 Mamaw
 1988 Strike Commando 2
 1988 A Dangerous Life (miniseries) as Major General Prospero Olivas
 1988 Agila ng Maynila
 1989 The Expendables as Tranh Um Phu
 1994 Fortunes of War
 1995 Closer to Home (Elibon Film Productions)
 1997 Fight and Revenge 2000 Kahit Demonyo Itutumba Ko (ZMM Productions)
 2000 Tunay na Tunay: Gets Mo? Gets Ko! (Star Cinema)
 2001 Yamashita: The Tiger's Treasure'' (Regal Films)

References

External links

Short Film Montage covering 50 years of Vic Diaz: www.youtube.com/watch?v=nIprz4OByag

1932 births
2006 deaths
20th-century Filipino male actors
21st-century Filipino male actors
Male actors from Manila